Jermaine Antwann Curtis (born July 10, 1987) is an American former professional baseball left fielder. He played in Major League Baseball (MLB) for the St. Louis Cardinals.

Career

Amateur
Curtis attended the University of California, Los Angeles (UCLA), where he played college baseball for the UCLA Bruins baseball team. In 2007, he played collegiate summer baseball with the Chatham A's of the Cape Cod Baseball League and was named a league all-star.

St. Louis Cardinals
The St. Louis Cardinals selected Curtis in the fifth round of the 2008 Major League Baseball draft. He made his professional debut that season playing for the Class A-Short Season Batavia Muckdogs. In 2009, he played for the Class A-Advanced Palm Beach Cardinals and Class A Quad City River Bandits. He played for Palm Beach and the Double-A Springfield Cardinals in 2010. Curtis spent the entire 2011 season with Springfield, but played that winter with the Cañeros de Los Mochis of the Liga Mexicana del Pacífico. He opened the 2012 season with the Triple-A Memphis Redbirds, but ended the season with Double-A Springfield. He again played winter ball with Los Mochis after the season.

He began the 2013 season with Memphis, but was called up by the St. Louis Cardinals on April 26 after Matt Adams was placed on the disabled list. Curtis made his major league debut the next day as a pinch hitter. He was optioned back to Triple-A about a week later after appearing in three games. He was recalled in mid-August, hitting off the bench in two games. He was outrighted to Triple-A on November 20, 2013.

That winter, Curtis played for the Águilas Cibaeñas of the Dominican Winter League. He played the entire 2014 season with Triple-A Memphis. He was granted free agency after the season.

Cincinnati Reds
On December 23, 2014, Curtis signed a minor league contract with the Cincinnati Reds. Excluding a month-and-a-half stint on the disabled list late in the season, he played the entire 2015 season with the Triple-A Louisville Bats. He elected free agency on November 6, 2015, but later re-signed with the Reds. He again played with Louisville in 2016, missing the last month of the season due to injury. He elected free agency after the season.

Oakland Athletics
Curtis signed a minor league contract with the Oakland Athletics for 2017. He played two games with the Triple-A Nashville Sounds before being transferred to the Double-A Midland RockHounds. He was reassigned to Nashville about two weeks later. He elected free agency on November 6, 2017.

Minnesota Twins
On January 21, 2018, Curtis signed a minor league deal with the Minnesota Twins. He was released on June 6, 2018.

Somerset Patriots
On June 26, 2018, Curtis signed with the Somerset Patriots of the Atlantic League of Professional Baseball. He was released on July 28, 2018.

References

External links

UCLA Bruins bio
Jermaine Curtis Online Store

1987 births
Living people
People from Fontana, California
People from Panorama City, Los Angeles
Baseball players from California
St. Louis Cardinals players
UCLA Bruins baseball players
Chatham Anglers players
Batavia Muckdogs players
Quad Cities River Bandits players
Palm Beach Cardinals players
Springfield Cardinals players
Memphis Redbirds players
Cañeros de Los Mochis players
Águilas Cibaeñas players
American expatriate baseball players in the Dominican Republic
Louisville Bats players
Nashville Sounds players
Midland RockHounds players
Naranjeros de Hermosillo players
American expatriate baseball players in Mexico
Rochester Red Wings players
Somerset Patriots players
Major League Baseball outfielders
Baseball infielders